The Venerable  John Griffiths, BD  (1820 – 1 September 1897), Rector of Neath, was Archdeacon of Llandaff from 1877 to  1897.

He was educated at  St David's College, Lampeter. A past Headmaster of Cardigan Grammar School he was  six times President  of the  National Eisteddfod of Wales.

References

1820 births
1897 deaths
People from Ceredigion
Alumni of the University of Wales, Lampeter
Archdeacons of Llandaff
Presidents of the National Eisteddfod of Wales